Tommy Malone may refer to:

 Tommy Malone (musician), American musician
 Tommy Malone (basketball), Irish basketball player